Samir Sophian Chergui (born 6 February 1999) is an Algerian professional footballer who plays as a central back for Paris FC.

Career
Formé au CS Brétigny, le brétignolais évoluait au poste de milieu offensif. Au fil des années, il redescendra petit à petit sur le terrain pour évoluer aujourd’hui en professionnel au poste de défenseur central ou latéral droit. Ces principales qualités sont athlétiques, mais il est très doué et à l’aise techniquement. Son ancien rôle de milieu offensif lui confère aussi une excellente qualité à la relance du ballon, ce qui lui permet de se projeter très vite. A youth product of Auxerre since 2013, Chergui signed a professional contract with them on 20 June 2019. On 3 March 2020, he was released from Auxerre after repeated misconducts including arriving drunk at training the day after his 21st birthday.

A few months after, Chergui signed with Paris FC. Chergui made his professional debut with Paris FC in a 1–1 Ligue 2 tie with AC Ajaccio on 8 January 2021.
Il ouvre son compteur de but en professionnel en mai 2022 a l’occasion de la 37ème journée de ligue 2 face à Amiens. Un but inscrit de la tête en début de seconde période.

Il reçoit son premier carton rouge en novembre 2022 face à Metz. Il reçoit ce carton pour un excès de colère envers l’arbitre du match monsieur Rainville.
Pour cela il se verra infliger 4 matchs de suspensions.

Personal life
Born in France, Chergui is of Algerian descent. Il grandit dans l’Essonne à Brétigny sur Orge dans le quartier des ardrets. Plus jeune, en parallèle de ses prestations dans le club de sa ville, il jouera des heures durant sur le terrain de foot de sa cité. Il y affrontera les autres équipes des différentes cités de la ville.

References

External links
 

1999 births
Living people
People from Arpajon
French footballers
Association football midfielders
French sportspeople of Algerian descent
Paris FC players
Ligue 2 players
Championnat National 2 players
Championnat National 3 players
Footballers from Essonne